Emilio Gutiérrez Caba (born 26 September 1942) is a Spanish film and television actor.

Personal
From his mother's side, he is the grandson of actress  and the great-grandson of actor . He is the nephew of actress Julia Caba Alba and the granduncle of actress Irene Escolar. He was born on 26 September 1942 at Valladolid's Calle Platerías while his parents were on tour, moving to Madrid three days later. He studied philosophy and began acting while at university.

Following a stage debut in 1962, he made his feature film debut in Jess Franco's El llanero (1963).

Awards
He has won two Goya Awards as Best Supporting Actor for his roles in La comunidad and El cielo abierto.

Selected filmography

Film

References

External links
 

1942 births
Living people
People from Valladolid
Spanish male film actors
Spanish male television actors
Best Supporting Actor Goya Award winners
20th-century Spanish male actors
21st-century Spanish male actors